Greece was represented by -a record number of- 45 athletes at the 2003 World Championships in Athletics in Paris, France.

Medals

Results

See also
Greece at the IAAF World Championships in Athletics

References

Periklis IAKOVAKIS - 2003 World Championships 400mh bronze medal. - Greece

2003
World Championships in Athletics
Nations at the 2003 World Championships in Athletics